Società Sportiva Dilettante Eurotezze was an Italian association football club located in Tezze sul Brenta, Veneto.

History 
The club was formed in 2007 after the merger of U.S.C.D. Eurocalcio Cassola and A.C. Tezze sul Brenta.

The dissolution 
In the summer 2009 it does not join 2011-12 Serie D and was so excluded from all football.

Colors and badge 
Its colors were blue and red.

References 

Association football clubs established in 2007
Association football clubs disestablished in 2009
Football clubs in Veneto
2007 establishments in Italy
2009 disestablishments in Italy